Coal Creek is a small recreated town in the South Gippsland area of Victoria, Australia, now essentially a suburb of Korumburra.

Black coal was discovered in the area in 1872, and the region subsequently developed an important coal mining industry. The mine at Coal Creek operated from the 1880s to the 1958, when operations ceased. A Post Office was open from 1894 to 1897.

Coal Creek Heritage Village, a 15-hectare open-air museum, was established at the site in 1974.  Now called Coal Creek Community Park and Museum, the park became an accredited museum in 2014.  It is home to many local groups and organisations and has a large education program.  Several events are held during the year which have proved extremely popular with local people and the surrounding communities.

See also
Korumburra
Nyora

References

External links
Coal Creek Heritage Village homepage

Towns in Victoria (Australia)
Mines in Victoria (Australia)
Mining towns in Victoria (Australia)
Coal mines in Victoria (Australia)